A battlefield management system (BMS) is a system meant to integrate information acquisition and processing to enhance command and control of a military unit.

France

The French Army is using SICS (Système d'Information du Combat de SCORPION - SCORPION combat information system), a battlefield management system developed by Atos.

Pakistan

The Pakistan Army has been using an integrated battlefield management system called PAK-IBMS (Rehbar).

India

The Indian Army was developing its first BMS, with estimated completion in 2025.  However, recent developments indicate foreclosure of this project.

Ukraine

See Delta.

References 

Military technology